AaB Kvinde Elitefodbold; commonly known as AaB Kvinder, is a Danish women's football team based in Aalborg, North Jutland, who plays in the Danish top-division Elitedivisionen. 

AaB does not belong to AaB A/S, as it is a company structure which means that AaB's men's and women's teams are separated by being located in their respective companies.

The team promoted to the Danish Elitedivisionen in June 2020, for the first time in the clubs history.

Squad

References

External links
Official website

Women's football clubs in Denmark
Association football clubs established in 2011
Sport in Aalborg
2011 establishments in Denmark